Resinoporia crassa is a species of fungus belonging to the family Fomitopsidaceae.

It is found in Europe and North America.

References

Fomitopsidaceae
Fungi of Europe
Fungi of North America
Fungi described in 1889
Taxa named by Petter Adolf Karsten